The Impact Zone is the nickname for any one of three sound stages at Universal Studios Florida in Orlando derived from Impact!, a weekly television series produced by the professional wrestling promotion Impact Wrestling (formerly Total Nonstop Action (TNA) Wrestling).

Between 2004 and March 2013, Impact Wrestling produced and broadcast programming from Soundstage 21. As part of the agreement with Universal, the promotion was not allowed to charge general admission to events held at the Impact Zone, with the exception of VIP packages. From March 2013, until November 21, the promotion left Universal Studios and began to tour nationally. Upon their return to Universal Studios, Impact began using Soundstage 19, which is smaller and holds fewer people than Soundstage 21. Impact would continue to produce programming from Universal Studios until April 2018, when they began touring once again. Since 2021, the site has served as the main studio for tapings of AEW Dark, one of the weekly online streaming programs for All Elite Wrestling (AEW). In 2023, AEW's sister promotion Ring of Honor began taping its weekly program at the venue.

History

World Championship Wrestling (WCW)
In 1996, World Championship Wrestling (WCW) began taping their syndicated wrestling shows, WCW Pro and WCW Worldwide, from Soundstage 21, which they called the "WCW Arena". WCW continued to tape the shows and occasional episodes of WCW Saturday Night until 1998, when Pro was canceled and matches for Worldwide were taped before WCW Thunder.

Xcitement Wrestling Federation (XWF) 
On November 12 and 13, 2001, the Xcitement Wrestling Federation (XWF) would tape several matches from Soundstage 21.

Total Nonstop Action Wrestling (TNA) / Impact Wrestling

In May 2004, TNA announced that they would be starting their first nationally broadcast television show, TNA Impact on Fox SportsNet which would be taped at Universal Studios as part of an agreement reached with the theme park. Accordingly, TNA leased Soundstage 21 for the purposes of putting on wrestling events for an indefinite period of time.

In August 2006 at Hard Justice, a fire sparked in the rafters of the Impact Zone. The fire was the result of pyrotechnics igniting a burlap sandbag. The sound stage was evacuated for approximately 20 minutes while the Orlando Fire Department inspected the resultant damage and the building in general. Afterwards, the audience was allowed back in and the show resumed with only one match canceled.

On January 31, 2013, TNA announced that they would be taping Impact Wrestling from different venues around the United States, with the first live show on March 14, 2013, from the Sears Centre Arena near Chicago. The final episodes from the Impact Zone were filmed on February 28, 2013, and March 7, 2013. 

TNA returned to Universal Studios on November 21, 2013. 

After the April 2018 tapings, Impact would resume touring other venues and countries. Bleachers used in the Impact Zone went onto sale on eBay in August.

All Elite Wrestling (AEW) / Ring of Honor
On August 27, 2021, All Elite Wrestling (AEW) announced that one of their weekly web series, AEW Dark, would be taped at its own set within Universal Studios at Soundstage 21. The first set of tapings for Dark began on September 11, 2021. In 2023, AEW's sister promotion Ring of Honor began taping its weekly show at Universal Studios.

Statistics

List of stages

List of live pay-per-view events held in the Impact Zone

Notes 
1.The numbers represent the approximate maximum capacities and do not reflect the actual attendance at the events.

References

External links
 Impactwrestling.com - the official website of Impact Wrestling
Internet Wrestling Database - Impact Zone - Results from professional wrestling cards promoted at the Impact Zone from 2004–present

Indoor arenas in Florida
Entertainment venues in Florida
Impact Wrestling
Universal Parks & Resorts attractions
Universal Studios Florida
1990 establishments in Florida